Best of Budgie may refer to:

 Best of Budgie (1975 album)
 Best of Budgie (1981 album)
 Best of Budgie (1997 album)